Stephen Harold Hanson (April 27, 1902 - August 1, 1981) was a player in the National Football League. He was a member of the Kansas City Cowboys during the 1925 NFL season, but did not see any playing time during a regular season game. The following season, he was a member of the Louisville Colonels.

References

1902 births
1981 deaths
American football ends
Carthage Firebirds football players
Kansas City Cowboys (NFL) players
Louisville Colonels (NFL) players
Players of American football from Wisconsin
Sportspeople from the Milwaukee metropolitan area
Sportspeople from Racine, Wisconsin